is an 11-episode Japanese anime television series created by Mandelbrot Engine, an artist collective consisting of critic and novelist Hiroki Azuma, screenwriter Mari Okada, and director Yutaka Yamamoto. The anime aired in Japan between January and March 2011 on Fuji TV's Noitamina programming block. A manga illustrated by Mutsumi Akasaki was serialized in Square Enix's Gangan Online between September 2010 and November 2011.

Plot
The story takes place on an island resembling a 22nd-century Republic of Ireland (certain scenes are taken directly from Galway, a city in the west of Ireland), in a world ruled by "Fractale", a satellite-based virtual reality and content delivery system which ensures mankind's stability and prosperity. One day, Clain meets a fleeing girl called Phryne, who disappears during the night leaving a pendant. When he is able to activate the pendant (which turns into a "doppel" named Nessa), Clain sets out on a journey with the girl-shaped avatar Nessa to look for Phryne and discovers the secret behind the Fractale System.

Characters

Main characters

Clain is the main character. At the beginning of the series, he lives alone with "doppels"—holographic robots-which are representations of his parents. Although they act exactly as his real parents would, Clain is able to disperse them at will when he is tired of their talk. In terms of interests, Clain holds a strong curiosity in items created before the Fractale system was established such as an antique digital camera or a 21st century cell phone. Throughout the series, he is shown to be emotionally simple; all he really wants is to live happily together with his friends Phryne and Nessa.

Phryne is a priestess of the Fractale system and later revealed to be the incomplete key to resetting Fractale. She is very closed about her background, partially due to sexual abuse. Often, she makes Clain blush due to her little sense of embarrassment and lack of decency. At the beginning of the series, Phryne runs away to try to stop the Fractale cycle. She is reluctant to make friends because she believes it is necessary for her to sacrifice herself for the good of all.

Nessa is a "doppel" copy of Phryne's younger self, composed of "data" important to the Fractale system. Her existence is unique because, unlike other doppels, she can be touched, but only by people she chooses. Her character is very cheerful, energetic, and carefree. Clain meets Nessa for the first time when she suddenly appears out of Phryne's brooch. She smiles a lot and likes to explore, even occasionally dragging Clain into trouble. Her motto is often quoted to be that she "loves love." Like Clain, she expresses that she simply wants to be together with her friends.

Supporting characters

The leader of the Granitz faction of Lost Millennium that Clain first encounters with. He is harsh and rude to Clain at first, but gradually, he lightens up. During the final confrontation, Sunda helps Clain enter the Temple and search for Phyrne. While in the Temple, Sunda sacrifices himself to allow Clain to join Phyrne and Nessa while they journey to reach the Temple's inner sanctum.

Enri is Sunda's little sister. Although clumsy in many ways, she supports her brother in every way she can, and often helps command Lost Millennium troops. At the conclusion of the series, Enri becomes the leader of the Granitz faction and helps teach those who were once dependent on Fractale to live independent lives.

Dias is the leader of the Alabaster faction of Lost Millennium. While Dias seems friendly at first, he is actually extremely manipulative and cold hearted, such as tricking a group of Fractale refugees into removing their terminals and forcing them to join his faction, gunning down one refugee when he attempts to flee. Dias joins with Sunda to rescue Phryne and Clain from the Temple, but exploits the opportunity to destroy the facility instead. During the final confrontation between Lost Millennium and the Temple, Dias's troops sacrifice themselves to destroy the Temple. When Archpriestess Moeran offers Sunda, Clain, and himself safety so that they may witness the restart of Fractale, he uses the opportunity to get close to Moeran, killing both in a suicidal explosion.

Antagonists

Moeran is the Archpriestess of the Temple and a Phryne clone. Although she is the head of the temple, Moeran has a great hatred for Phryne because the younger clone is "beloved", giving Phryne a greater importance than Moeran. When Phryne confronts Moeran in order to stop the violence between the Temple and Lost Millennium, Moeran attempts to strangle the younger clone out of jealousy. In the conclusion of the series, she offers Sunda, Clain, and Dias safety while they witness the restart of Fractale. However, Dias uses the opportunity to get close to Moeran, killing both in an explosion.

Barrot is a priest in charge of raising Phryne to become the "key" to restarting Fractale. Barrot is often overly affectionate towards Phryne, frequently groping her body when he is together with her and even insists on witnessing her gynecological exam to check that she has not been "spoiled". At the end of the series, Barrot reveals the full truth about Phryne and Nessa to Clain and that he had been using some of the clones for his own sexual pleasure. However, while proclaiming that Phryne is his alone, she stabs him with a knife and runs off.

Media

Manga
A manga adaptation illustrated by Mutsumi Akasaki was serialized in Square Enix's Gangan Online magazine between September 30, 2010 and November 17, 2011. Three tankōbon volumes were published.

|}

Anime
The 11-episode Fractale anime television series produced by A-1 Pictures in cooperation with Ordet, aired in Japan between January 13 and March 31, 2011 on Fuji TV's Noitamina programming block. The anime aired on Kansai TV and Tokai TV at later dates. The anime is directed by Yutaka Yamamoto, the story was developed by Hiroki Azuma, and the screenplay was written by Mari Okada. Chief animator Masako Tashiro based the character design used in the anime on the illustrator Hidari's original concept. The music was produced by Sōhei Shikano and the sound director is Yōta Tsuruoka. The single containing the opening theme and the English version of the ending theme was released on March 9, 2011 by Epic/Sony Records. The series was released on four DVD and Blu-ray compilation volumes between April 22 and July 22, 2011. North American anime distributor Funimation Entertainment streamed the series one hour after the premiere on their video portal and other sites after a brief interruption by the Fractale Production Committee that lasted until Funimation started taking legal action against illegally released episodes of the anime. Funimation released the series in 2012 on DVD and Blu-ray.

Episode list

Novel
A serial novel written by Hiroki Azuma based on Fractale titled  was serialized between the February and May 2011 issues of Media Factory's Da Vinci magazine. The novel features a different story in the Fractale universe than the manga and anime, which follow the same story.

Notes

References

External links
Anime official website 
Manga official website 

2010 manga
2011 Japanese novels
2011 Japanese television series debuts
2011 Japanese television series endings
A-1 Pictures
Aniplex franchises
Anime with original screenplays
Funimation
Gangan Online manga
Japanese serial novels
Japanese webcomics
Noitamina
Ordet (studio)
Science fiction anime and manga
Shōnen manga
Television shows written by Mari Okada
Webcomics in print